Bridal Mask is a 2012 KBS2 period drama based on the popular Korean manhwa by Huh Young-man. Set in Seoul, Korea, during the 1930s Japanese colonial era, the story follows a man named Lee Kang-to, a Korean police officer commissioned by the Japanese Police to betray his own country and aid the Japanese in the annihilation of the Korean rebellion. It stars Joo Won, Jin Se-yeon and Shin Hyun-joon.

Synopsis
In the 1930s, Lee Kang-to lives in Korea, which is oppressed under Imperial Japanese rule. Despite being Korean, he works with the Japanese police in order to capture "Bridal Mask," a mysterious rebel who fights for Korean independence. Later, he secretly dons the Bridal Mask and fights the unjust Japanese regime. He struggles to balance his personal facade as a Japanese police officer and his private life as Bridal Mask.

Kimura Shunji is a gentle Japanese schoolteacher. He is best friends with Kang-to and falls in love with the fiercely patriotic Mok-dan. His hatred for Bridal Mask and unrequited love for Mok-dan twists him into a darker person.

Cast

Main
Joo Won as Lee Kang-to/Sato Hiroshi/Lee Young (childhood name)
 A pro-Japanese Korean police officer. He is despised by his fellow countrymen for being a traitor to his homeland. Later, he secretly becomes the masked vigilante known as Gaksital (Bridal Mask) and fights for Korea's independence using his skills in Martial arts (Taekkyon). He actually is the second Gaksital as his brother was the original one.

Jin Se-yeon as Oh Mok-dan/Esther/Boon-yi (childhood name)
 A fiercely patriotic Korean woman. Her father is Damsari, an important general of the Independence army. She loves Gaksital and hates Kang-to, unaware that they are the same person.

Park Ki-woong as  Kimura Shunji
 Although he is born into a prominent Samurai family, Shunji defies his father and becomes a music teacher for Korean children. After his brother Kenji's death, he becomes the head of the Japanese Police Force and vows to kill Gaksital, unaware that it is his best friend Kang-to. He has an unrequited love for Mok-dan.

Han Chae-ah as Ueno Rie/Lara/Chae Hong-joo
 A Korean woman whose aristocratic family was murdered by the Independence army. Orphaned, she voluntarily becomes a "gisaeng" but was adopted by a prominent Japanese man. She returns to Korea on a mission to kill Gaksital, but she inadvertently falls in love with Lee Kang-to.

Shin Hyun-joon as  Lee Kang-san/Lee In (childhood name)
Kang-to's older brother. He is tortured by the Japanese police for joining the Independence movement and is rendered mentally ill. Considered as a disgrace and burden to a family by Lee Kang-to, Kang-to takes little interest in his brother. It is later revealed that he is the original Gaksital and he has been pretending to be mentally ill the whole time. Kang-to accidentally kills him not knowing he is his brother. His death causes Kang-to to succeed his brother as Gaksital.

Supporting
Chun Ho-jin - Kimura Taro (Father of Shunji; Chief of the Jongro police station, Chairman of Gyeongseong branch of Kishokai) 
Jeon No-min - Mok Damsari (Mok-dan's father and the General of the Independence Army)
Son Byong-ho - Circus Master Jo Dong-ju (Leader of the Circus team)
Song Ok-sook - Mrs. Han (Kang-to's mother)
Lee Il-jae - Lee Seon (Kang-to's father)
Ahn Hyung-joon - Katsuyama Jun (Chae Hong-joo's bodyguard) 
Lee Byung-joon - Shin Nan-da (Circus member)
Ahn Suk-hwan - Lee Shi-yong (Royal Count, Kishokai member)
Kim Jung-nan - Lee Hwa-gyung (Royal Countess, Kishokai member)
Lee Kyung-shil - Oh Dong-nyeon (Widowed circus member who regards Mok-dan as her own daughter)
Kim Tae-young - Park In-sam (Kyeongseong Ilbo newspaper owner, Kishokai member)
Son Yeo-eun - Um Sun-hwa (Mok-dan's best friend, Circus member)
Seo Yun-a - Ham Gye-soon (Circus member and Shunji's spy) 
Park Joo-hyung - Kimura Kenji (Former Captain of Jongro police station, Kishokai member)
Jeon Gook-hwan - Ueno Hideki (Chairman of Kishokai, a secret organization involved in the assassinations of the last Emperor and Empress of Joseon, adopted father of Chae Hong-joo) 
Bruce Khan - Ginpei Gato (Chairman Ueno's samurai bodyguard) 
Kim Eung-soo - Konno Goji (Director of the Kyeongseong police force) 
Yoon Jin-ho - Goiso Tadanobu (Sergeant of Jongro police station) 
Yoon Bong-kil - Abe Shinji (Private of Jongro police station) 
Ban Min-jung - Jeok Pa/Anna (Comrade of Damsari) 
Ji Seo-yun - Tasha (Owner of Angel Club) 
Baek Jae-jin - Director Bong (Manager of Angel Club)
Choi Dae-hoon - Lee Hae-suk/Minami Tamao (Count's son, Kishokai member) 
Bang Joong-hyun - Park Sung-mo (Newspaper owner's son, Kishokai member after replacing his father, In-sam) 
Jang Joon-yoo - Merry
Lee Jae-won - No Sang-yeob
Kim Kyu-chul - Woo Byung-joon (Hospital director, Kishokai member) 
Ko In-beom - Jo Young-geun (President of Jo Il Bank, Kishokai member) 
Kwon Tae-won - Choi Myung-sub (Judge, Kishokai member) 
Kim Bang-won - Kim Deuk-soo (Member of Dong Jin's Death Squad)
Jeon Hyun - Baek Gun (Subordinate of Kang-to's father)
Kim Myung-gon - Yang-baek (Leader of Korean Freedom Fighters)
Park Sung-woong - Dong-jin (Leader of Dong-jin's Death Squad)
Park Bo-gum - Han Min-gyu (Gye-soon's Younger Brother)

Production accident
The drama was originally expected to air on May 9, 2012 but a bus accident resulting in the death of a stunt double and serious injuries of other crew members, which caused delays in production.  Thus, on the last episode that aired on September 6, 2012, KBS has sent out a formal apology message towards the relatives of the victims and friends.

Ratings

Sources: TNmS Media Korea, AGB Nielsen Korea

Awards and nominations

International broadcast
  It aired on Workpoint TV beginning January 13, 2015, dubbed as Nakak Peesaj. ("หน้ากากปีศาจ", literally: Devil Mask).
  It aired on UNTV on This 2021

See also 

 Japanese occupation of Korea
 Korean independence movement
 Taekkyon

References

External links 
  
 
 

Korean-language television shows
2012 South Korean television series debuts
2012 South Korean television series endings
South Korean historical television series
Korean Broadcasting System television dramas
Television shows based on works by Huh Young-man
Television series set in Korea under Japanese rule
South Korean action television series
South Korean romance television series
South Korean espionage television series
Television shows based on manhwa
Television series by Pan Entertainment